Komarovo is a rural locality (a khutor) in Popovskoye Rural Settlement, Rossoshansky District, Voronezh Oblast, Russia. The population was 63 as of 2010.

References 

Rural localities in Rossoshansky District